The First Seven Inches is the first EP released by punk band Sloppy Seconds. It was released in 1987 on the band's own Alternative Testicles label. In 1992, it was reissued on Taang! Records under the title The First Seven Inches...And Then Some! along with 10 bonus tracks of various b-sides and outtakes from the band's first two albums and prior. The CD release included the Misfits cover "Where Eagles Dare." For the album's 1999 reissue, the band's Lonely Christmas EP is included as a bonus disk.

Track listing

Notes
Tracks 9 - 11 first appeared on the compilation, Black Brittle Frisbee, as well the Germany EP.
Track 6 was a B-side to "Come Back, Traci" (also included on some pressings of Destroyed.
Track 15 was a non-LP single.
Track 13 first appeared on the compilation, There's A Method To Our Madness in 1986.
Tracks 1, 3, 9, and 11 were later re-recorded for the band's debut LP, Destroyed.

Credits
 B.A. - noise, producer
 Steve Sloppy - drums, producer
 Shazam Bo'Bajam - bass, producer
 Danny Roadkill - guitar, producer
 Bobby Steele - guest guitar & vocals on Where Eagles Dare
 Curtis - executive producer
 Mike Kreffel - artwork
 Lee Cuthbert - engineer
 Jim - engineer

1987 debut EPs
Sloppy Seconds albums